Andreas Govas (born 21 July 1989) is a Greek Australian former footballer. During the 2007–08 season, he was a member of Portsmouth's Academy. He played for Greece's national youth team with Greek-Australians Dean Bouzanis and Paul Giannou.

Club career
Govas trained at the Victorian Institute of Sport along side Paul Giannou, Matthew Spiranovic, Adrian Leijer, Leigh Broxham, Milos Lujic, Dimitri Hatzimouratis and Matthew Theodore, where he was coached by Ernie Merrick. Following his apprenticeship at the Victorian Institute of Sport, Govas was invited for a one-day trial with the Australian Institute of Sport and was not ultimately not selected, however, this followed by earning a contract with Portsmouth's Academy and Reserves.

Portsmouth
Govas signed his first professional contract with Premier League outfit Portsmouth F.C. for the 2007–08 season, joining the club's Academy and Reserves teams under director Paul Hart. On 27 October 2007, he appeared in a game for the Academy. On 12 November 2007, Govas appeared for the Academy team in another game. On 17 December 2007, Govas made his last appearance of the year in a game for Portsmouth's Academy. On 23 January 2008, he was an unused substitute in a 1–0 home loss for Portsmouth's reserves against West Ham United. On 19 February 2008, he appeared again for the reserves. On 21 April 2008, Govas appeared for the Academy team and made his last appearance for the club. In July 2008, he departed Portsmouth to join Greek club Apollon Kalamarias.

Greece
In July 2008, Govas transferred to Greek club Apollon Kalamarias. where he and Australian Apostolos Giannou played together in the Greek Football League, a year which saw Govas gain 7 appearances before transferring to FS Kozani.

In January 2010 Govas signed for Greek Superleague Club AO Kavala where he joined fellow Australians; Zeljko Kalac, Apostolos Giannou, Craig Moore and Robert Stambolziev.

France
In January 2012, he signed a six-month contract with French Ligue 2 side Troyes AC who were promoted in the same season to Ligue 1.

Return to Greece
In September 2012, he signed a two-year contract with Kalloni in the Greek Football League. He played an important role throughout the season helping Kalloni FC gain automatic promotion to the Greek Superleague for the first time in the club's history.

Return to Australia
In February 2014, Govas signed for National Premier League club Oakleigh Cannons FC under coach Miron Bleiberg. The Cannons finished league runners up in Govas' only season with the club. In November 2014, Govas signed for his childhood football club Heidelberg United in the National Premier League. Govas scored an incredible long-range goal in April 2015 as Heidelberg beat Green Gully by a scoreline of 8–2. On 15 June 2016 Govas left the Bergers mid-season for league counterparts FC Bulleen Lions. In 2017 Govas signed for National Premier League club Port Melbourne SC and was one of the best players throughout the 2017 season scoring numerous long bombs along the way. In 2018 Govas signed for National Premier League club Heidelberg United FC.

International career
In July 2008, Govas was listed in a group of Australian footballers aged between 16 to 22 known as "the lost boys", including Paul Giannou, Robert Stambolziev and Dean Bouzanis, who were likely to play for or had played for national teams of the country of their heritage.

He was a part of the Australia U-20 team that participated in and won the 2008 ASEAN Youth Championship.

He was also a part of the Australia U-20 team that competed at the AFC U-19 Championship 2008.

In 2008, he had also represented Greece's national U-19 squad with Apostolos Giannou and Dean Bouzanis. It had been reported that Govas, Giannou and Bouzanis chose to represent Greece as they had been snubbed by Australian national selectors.

"I represented the Victorian squad at Under 15 and Under 16 levels and I was lucky enough to have been selected for the VIS to be part of a development program aimed at producing players for the national team. As I came towards the end of my time at VIS I was hoping to get an international call-up or an invitation to the AIS. I was invited up to the AIS for a trial, but unfortunately I was not in the (selected) 18 and was sent home. I thought I was really good while on trial there and was surprised not to have been picked. I was also then told that I would not be in the mix for AIS selection, so I looked overseas." – Govas speaking with Melbourne's Greek newspaper Neos Kosmos

Honours
NPL Victoria Team of the Week Round 2 2017

With  Australia
 AFF U19 Youth Championship 2008

References

External links
 Australian Football Database Profile

1989 births
Greek footballers
Australian people of Greek descent
Greek expatriate footballers
Kavala F.C. players
Soccer players from Melbourne
Super League Greece players
Victorian Institute of Sport alumni
Living people
Association football midfielders
Port Melbourne SC players
Oakleigh Cannons FC players
Heidelberg United FC players
AEL Kalloni F.C. players
Kozani F.C. players
Australian expatriate sportspeople in France
Australian expatriate sportspeople in England
Greek expatriate sportspeople in England
Greek expatriate sportspeople in France
Australian soccer players
Australian expatriate soccer players
Expatriate footballers in England
Expatriate footballers in France
Greece youth international footballers
Australia under-20 international soccer players